Hell is the twelfth studio album by heavy metal band Venom. It was released in 2008 through Universal. It is the first Venom album to feature La Rage on guitar and the last to feature Antton on drums, who left Venom in 2009 and was replaced by Danté.

Track listing

A limited edition digipack version also includes live versions of "In League with Satan" and "Burn in Hell" from the 2007 Scandinavian tour.

Credits
Cronos – vocals, bass guitar
La Rage – guitar
Antton – drums

References

2008 albums
Venom (band) albums
Spinefarm Records albums